David Lewis Evans (3 September 1919 – 27 September 2017) was an Australian rugby league footballer who played in the 1940s.

Lew Evans came to Sydney from Newcastle, New South Wales with Ray Ainsworth in 1946, just after he was discharged from war service in the RAAF.

During his three years at St. George, Evans played a total of 70 grade games, 20 of them in first grade.  After three years at Saints, he moved to Temora as captain/coach in 1949 and remained there for most of his life. 

Evans died on 27 September 2017, aged 98.

References

1919 births
2017 deaths
Australian rugby league players
Royal Australian Air Force officers
Royal Australian Air Force personnel of World War II
Rugby league locks
Rugby league players from Briton Ferry
St. George Dragons players
Welsh military personnel